Pseudatemelia latipennella is a moth of the family Oecophoridae. It was described by Jäckh, in 1959. It is found in France, the Benelux, Germany, Denmark, Austria, Slovakia and the Czech Republic.

The wingspan is 18-22.5 mm.

References

Moths described in 1959
Amphisbatinae
Moths of Europe